Angela's Kitchen is an Australian play by Paul Capsis, Hilary Bell and Julian Meyrick. It won the Best New Australian Work at the 12th Helpmann Awards.

First Production
Angela’s Kitchen was first produced by the Griffin Theatre Company at The Stables Theatre, Sydney, on 5 November 2010, with the following participants:

Performer, Paul Capsis

Director, Julian Meyrick

Associate Writer, Hilary Bell

Designer, Louise McCarthy

Lighting Designer, Verity Hampson

Music, Sound and AV Designer, Steve Toulmin

References

Australian plays
2010 plays